María Vento-Kabchi and Angelique Widjaja were the defending champions, but lost in quarterfinals to Svetlana Kuznetsova and Arantxa Sánchez Vicario.

Anastasia Myskina and Ai Sugiyama won the title by defeating Svetlana Kuznetsova and Arantxa Sánchez Vicario 6–3, 7–5 in the final.

Seeds

Draw

Draw

References

External links
 Official results archive (ITF)
 Official results archive (WTA)

2004 WTA Tour
Commonwealth Bank Tennis Classic
Sport in Indonesia